El Madmo is the self-titled debut album from Norah Jones's tongue-in-cheek indie-rock band El Madmo.

A side project for jazzy singer/songwriter Norah Jones, El Madmo features Jones on guitar and vocals, bassist/vocalist Daru Oda,  and drummer Andrew Borger (of Jones' backing group the Handsome Band). Theatrical and often humorous (garishly glam makeup, wigs, and costumes are de rigueur), each member of El Madmo goes by a stage name, with Oda as El, Jones as Maddie, and Borger as Mo—hence the band name.

Track listing
 "Carlo!"
 "Head in a Vise"
 "Vampire Guy"
 "GGW"
 "Sweet Adrenaline"
 "Attack of the Rock People"
 "The Best Part"
 "Fantasy Guy"
 "I Like it Low"
 "Scary Lady"
 "Nonny Goat Mon"
 "Rock Yer Balls Off"

Personnel
Band members
 El (Daru Oda) - Bass/Vocals
 Maddie (Norah Jones) - Guitar/Vocals
 Mo (Andrew Borger) - Drums

References

Album

2008 debut albums
Norah Jones albums
Team Love Records albums